Manda  was a zamindari, with lands located near Allahabad, Uttar Pradesh, in northern India.

History

The predecessor state of Manikpur was founded in 1180, by Raja Manik Chand, brother of Raja Jai Chand of Kannauj. Raja Gudan Deo, 16th in descent from Raja Manik Chand, established his capital at Manda in 1542. Raja Ram Pratap Singh was granted the hereditary title of Raja Bahadur by the British Raj in January 1913. The Last Raja Bahadur of Manda, Ram Gopal Singh, adopted a son named Vishwanath Pratap Singh, who became the 7th Prime Minister of India.

Modern scenario 
After India got Independence in 1947, as per Indian Union Act (1947) the state merged with Republic of India and the state was abolished. The first Raja was VP Singh and was 41st Zamindar and after his death his son Ajeya Pratap Singh is the 42nd and current Zamindar of the zamindari.

Notes

External links
 Manda Raj Genealogy

References

History of Uttar Pradesh
1542 establishments in India